Getting Stoned with Savages: A Trip Through the Islands of Fiji and Vanuatu is a 2007 non-fiction travelog by J. Maarten Troost.

Summary
Following a job at the World Bank, Troost longs for his times spent in Kiribati and leaves the United States with his wife. The book is a humorous account of the author and his wife's time on the Pacific island nations of Vanuatu and Fiji.  It is a follow-up to Troost's first work The Sex Lives of Cannibals.

Reception
Critical reception for the book has been positive.

Kirkus Reviews said of the travel essays, "Living on a South Pacific island could be grim, horrifying and revolting, Troost writes, but never less than interesting."

Publishers Weekly mentioned it was a comic masterwork of travel writing.”

References

2007 non-fiction books